Skuodas (Samogitian: Skouds) is a city  located in Klaipėda County, in northwestern Lithuania, on the border with Latvia. The Bartuva river flows through the town.

History
Skuodas was first mentioned in written sources in 1253. At that time it belonged to Ceklis land. In 1572 city rights were granted to Skuodas thanks to Jan Hieronimowicz Chodkiewicz who owned the city. The same year after the city rights were granted, a new part of the city started to settle on the right wing of Bartuva river. In the centre of this part there were built a new rectangular square, town hall, commercial buildings.

After Chodkiewicz's era Sapieha family got the city as a trousseau and became the owners of Skuodas. Sapieha family owned the city until 1832. In 1776 Skuodas lost city rights and became just a border city with a customs.

In 1821 present masonry Evangelical Lutheran Church was built. In 1847 the current Catholic Church was built using masonry of stone and bricks. It reflects features of Romanesque Revival architecture. This church was consecrated by bishop Motiejus Valančius in 1850. In 1614 parish school was established.

Railway branch line Priekule-Klaipėda was built in 1915 and printing house was established in 1911.

The town had a Jewish community in the 19th century, with four synagogues. By 1897, almost 2,300 Jews formed 60% of the population and dominated commerce in the town. In 1941, following the German invasion, and the establishment of persecutions by Lithuanian nationalists, 500 Jews of the town were massacred.

During the interwar period Skuodas had about 4410 inhabitants. It was known for its shoe factory Kontinent. Skuodas also had a new cinema with modern equipment. The city suffered severely during World War II. After the war the ruined rectangular square was rebuilt. In 1992 the coat of arms of Skuodas was approved.

Nowadays Skuodas has a gymnasium, a primary school, a secondary school and a high school. There is also a museum, post office, centre of the culture, central hospital of municipality, foster home and public library in the city.

History of the name
The city's name Skuodas originated from the surname, Skuodas. Germans called the city  Schoden, and Skudn.

At the end of the 16th century, the new part of the city was called Johanisberg or Johanisburg. However these names did not catch on.

Famous residents
Eugenijus Gedgaudas (1924-2006), Lithuanian born USA radiologist;
Simonas Daukantas (1793-1864), famous Lithuanian historian, author of the first historical works in Lithuanian;
Vaclovas Intas (1927-2007), doctor, founder of Mosėdis Museum of Stones;
Vytautas Vaclovas Donėla (born 1930), Lithuanian philosopher;
Alvydas Duonėla (born 1976), retired Lithuanian canoeist, world champion;
Vygaudas Ušackas (born 1964), a Lithuanian diplomat, former Lithuania's Minister for Foreign Affairs, current  European Union's special representative and the head of EU mission for Russia;
Remigijus Motuzas (born 1956), a Lithuanian diplomat, current ambassador of Lithuania to Russia;
Zinaida Sendriūtė (born 1984), a Lithuanian discus thrower, represented Lithuania in the 2016 Olympic Games.

Twin cities
 Lindås, Norway

See also
 Skuodas district municipality

References

External links
 Official site
 Travel guide to Skuodas
The murder of the Jews of Skuodas during World War II, at Yad Vashem website.

 
Cities in Lithuania
Cities in Klaipėda County
Municipalities administrative centres of Lithuania
Telshevsky Uyezd
Holocaust locations in Lithuania